A California Historical Landmark (CHL) is a building, structure, site, or place in California that has been determined to have statewide historical landmark significance.

Criteria
Historical significance is determined by meeting at least one of these criteria:

 The first, last, only, or most significant of its type in the state or within a large geographic region (Northern, Central, or Southern California);
 Associated with an individual or group having a profound influence on the history of California; or
 An outstanding example of a period, style, architectural movement or construction; or is the best surviving work in a region of a pioneer architect, designer, or master builder.

Other designations
California Historical Landmarks numbered 770 and higher are automatically listed in the California Register of Historical Resources.

A site, building, feature, or event that is of local (city or county) significance may be designated as a California Point of Historical Interest.

Gallery

See also
 List of California Historical Landmarks by county

Federal historical landmarks
 National Historic Sites (United States)
 National Register of Historic Places listings in California

Local historical landmarks
 Bakersfield Register of Historic Places and Areas of Historic Interest
 Berkeley Landmarks, Structures of Merit, and Historic Districts
 Glendale Register of Historic Resources and Historic Districts
 Long Beach historic landmarks
 Los Angeles Historic-Cultural Monuments
 Oakland Designated Landmarks
 San Diego Historic Landmarks
 San Francisco Designated Landmarks
 San Luis Obispo Historic Resources
 Santa Barbara Historic Landmarks
 Santa Monica Designated Historic Landmarks
 City of Ventura Historic Landmarks and Districts
 Ventura County Historic Landmarks & Points of Interest

References

External links

 Official OHP—California Office of Historic Preservation website
  OHP: California Historical Sites searchpage — links to lists by county

 01
Heritage registers in California
.
 
California